Eagley Football Club is a football club based in the village of Eagley, near Bolton in Greater Manchester. The club are affiliated to the Lancashire Football Association. The club's colours are yellow shirts and dark blue shorts.

History
The original Eagley FC was formed in 1874. It was one of the first clubs in Lancashire playing under association football rules. The club was one of the founder members of the Lancashire County Football Association in 1878, and in 1878–79 it was the first recorded opponents of Preston North End, later to become the first ever English football champions. That season Eagley was the winner of the Turton Football Club Challenge Cup, the first football cup played for in Lancashire, and entered the FA Cup for the first time. In 1879–80, Eagley was one of the competitors in the first Lancashire Cup competition.

For the most part, Eagley were seen as a club "added to the fixtures as a make-up", but on 1 October 1881 the club pulled off a major shock result by beating Darwen, away from home, in a friendly, and in 1884 won the Bolton Charity Cup.

Nevertheless, with the rise of professional football, the original Eagley FC disbanded before the 1886-87 season.  Many years later it was revived as Eagley Mills FC, which played in the Manchester League and in 1959–60 was the winner of the Lancashire Amateur Shield.

The club declined in the 1970s until 1980 when a group of local enthusiasts stepped in to try to revive Eagley to some of its former glories. In 1981, the club appointed the ex-Walker Institute player Paul Thompson as manager with Peter Conroy as his assistant. This led to a further period of success in the Combination plus a Lancashire Junior Shield Final appearance, losing 3–2 to Latham & Burscough and a 2–1 Hospital Cup Final victory over Little Hulton. A new phase of the club's history was entered into on joining the West Lancashire League for the 1988–89 season. After two seasons settling into the league, the club appointed Terry Finney as team manager. Soon after, the club had success, being promoted to the Premier Division as champions. Finney's success continued over the next eight seasons with the club making appearances in the West Lancashire Presidents and Richardson's Cup finals, along with four Hospital Cup finals, winning two. However, during this period the club suffered a major blow when the clubhouse was completely destroyed by fire in August 1992. The Football and Cricket Clubs joined together to build a new clubhouse which is still used today.

From December 2013 to 2014, the club was managed by former Wales and Wigan Athletic striker Simon Haworth.

Colours

The original Eagley club wore white shirts and knickers, with blue hose.

Honours
West Lancashire League Premier Division
Runners-up 2003–04
West Lancashire League Division Two
Champions 1990–91

Records
FA Cup
Fourth Round 1882–83

References

External links
 

Sport in the Metropolitan Borough of Bolton
Association football clubs established in 1874
Football clubs in England
1874 establishments in England
West Lancashire Football League